House Resolution 23261, also known as the "American Hippo bill", was a bill introduced by Representative Robert F. Broussard of Louisiana in 1910 to authorize the importation and release of hippopotamus into the bayous of Louisiana. Broussard argued the hippos would eat the invasive water hyacinth that was clogging the rivers and also produce meat to help solve the American meat predicament. The chief collaborators and proponents of Broussard's bill were Major Frederick Russell Burnham and Captain Fritz Duquesne. Former President Theodore Roosevelt backed the plan, as did the U.S. Department of Agriculture, The Washington Post, and The New York Times, which praised hippo meat as "lake cow bacon". Although the "American Hippo Bill" developed a broad base of support, it was never passed by the US Congress.

References

Hippopotamuses
61st United States Congress